David Sibley (born 16 July 1948) is an English actor.

He is best known for character roles in several television series: as twisted radio DJ Tom Everett in BBC television detective series Shoestring (in the episode Mocking Bird); and in Doctor Who as Pralix (in The Pirate Planet). He appeared on a DVD extra when this story was released recently. His first regular television role was in Wings (BBC TV series) in 1977.

Other appearances include Blake's 7, Survivors, Fun at the Funeral Parlour, Target, Minder, Lovejoy, and the film Gandhi. He appeared as Eric Birling in the 1982 BBC adaptation of J.B. Priestley's An Inspector Calls.  He returned to television in The Year That London Blew Up (1995), a dramatisation of the IRA attacks on London in 1974–75. He played John Carver in Midsomer Murders in 2010. Between 2001 and 2012 he played four different characters in Doctors. In 2012 he was in New Tricks episode Part Of A Whole, playing journalist Nigel Baxter. 2014 starred as Freddie in the supernatural thriller The Sleeping Room.

Filmography

Notes

External links

English male film actors
English male television actors
Living people
1948 births
21st-century English male actors
20th-century English male actors